Neal Pollock is a Canadian academic and diver. Born in Edmonton, Canada he completed a bachelor's degree in zoology; the first three years at University of Alberta and the final year at the University of British Columbia. After completing a master's degree he then served as diving officer at University of British Columbia for almost five years. He then moved to Florida and completed a doctorate in exercise physiology/environmental physiology at Florida State University.

Positions
Pollock is the Research Chair in Hyperbaric and Diving Medicine at Laval University, Quebec . He also serves as an Associate Professor in the Department of Kinesiology, School of Medicine. The Chair position is possibly the first of its kind in North America. The purpose is to provide overarching support and promotion of hyperbaric and diving medicine.

Prior to this move in November 2016 Pollock was Research Director at Divers Alert Network, a Senior Research Associate at the Center for Hyperbaric Medicine and Environmental Physiology at Duke University Medical Center, a member of the Board of the American Academy of Underwater Sciences Foundation, a member of the Advisory Board of Divewise, chair of the International Breath Hold Blackout Task Force, and a member of Editorial Board of the journal Diving and Hyperbaric Medicine.

His academic training is in zoology/marine science, exercise physiology and environmental physiology; his research interests focus on human health and safety in extreme environments. Pollocck developed and maintains a breath-hold incident database for DAN that includes cases from 2004 forward. Summaries and case reports have appeared in DAN annual reports since 2005 and a variety of other publications. Pollock co-organised and edited the proceedings of the 2005 Undersea and Hyperbaric Medical Society / Divers Alert Network 'Diabetes and Recreational Diving: Guidelines For The Future Workshop. He co-chaired the Undersea and Hyperbaric Medical Society / Divers Alert Network 2006 breath-hold workshop and co-edited the proceedings published from that meeting, and was part of organising team behind the 2012 international safety symposium; Rebreather Forum 3 and co-edited the subsequent proceedings.

Pollock is a member of the 'Diver Medical Screen Committee ' (DMSC). This team of internationally respected diving medicine experts - Dr Nick Bird, Dr Oliver Firth, (the late) Professor Tony Frew, Dr Alessandro Marroni, Professor Simon Mitchell and Dr Adel Taher, revised the 'RSTC Diver Medical Declaration Form' and associated 'Notes for Physicians'. The process took three years and it was published in June 2020. The previous document dated from 1989.

Works
 Pollock, Neal W (2015) Radio Interview - 'How Gradient Factors, Thermal Factors And Heated Devices Affect Decompression Stress In Diving' At: Beneath The Sea, New York
 Pollock, Neal W (2014) A Quick And Dirty Review Of Gradient Factors At: EUROTEK Advanced Diving Conference, Birmingham, England
 
 
 
 
 
  In: 4(3): 17-9
 
  In: 2013 January 10
 Pollock, Neal W (2012) Thermal Physiology and Protection - Part one and Thermal Physiology and Protection - Part two At: Rebreather Forum 3, Friday 18 May 2012
 Sheldrake, Sean; Pollock, Neal W. "Alcohol and Diving". In: Steller D, Lobel L, eds. Diving for Science 2012. Proceedings of the American Academy of Underwater Sciences 31st Symposium. Dauphin Island, AL: AAUS; 2012.
  In Alert Diver Online
 
 
 Pollock, Neal W (2011) Assessment of Decompression Exposure At: International Congress on Hyperbaric Medicine, South Africa
 Pollock, Neal W (2011) Ultrasonography In Aerospace, Diving And Hyperbaric Medicine At: International Congress on Hyperbaric Medicine, South Africa
 
 Pollock, Neal W (2009) "Diving Dry - Thermal protection for extreme conditions". In Alert Diver Online
 
 
 
 Brueggeman P, Pollock Neal W, eds. Diving for Science 2008. Proceedings of the American Academy of Underwater Sciences 27th Symposium. Dauphin Island, AL: AAUS
 
 
 
 
 
 Lindholm P, Pollock NW, Lundgren CEG (2006). Breath-hold diving. Proceedings of the Undersea and Hyperbaric Medical Society/Divers Alert Network 2006 June 20–21 Workshop.. Durham, NC, United States: Divers Alert Network. .
 Pollock NW, Uguccioni DM, Dear GdeL, eds. (2005) "Guidelines to Diabetes & Recreational Diving". In: Proceedings of the Undersea and Hyperbaric Medical Society / Divers Alert Network 2005 June 19 Workshop. Durham, NC: Divers Alert Network; 2005.
  In: 2005 Spring; 6(1):32-42.
 
 
 Natoli, MJ; Hobbs, GW; Pollock, NW; Stolp, BW; Corkey, WB; Gabrielova, I; Hendricks, DM; Schinazi, EA; Almon, AK; Pieper, CF; Vann, RD (2000). ".
 
 Pollock, NW; Natoli, MJ; Hobbs, Gene W; Smith, RT; Winkler, PM; Hendricks, DM; Mutzbauer, TS; Muller, PHJ et al. (1999). "Testing and evaluation of the Divers Alert Network closed-circuit oxygen breathing apparatus (REMO2)". Divers Alert Network Technical Report.
 Neal W. Pollock, Richard D. Vann, Edward D. Thalmann and Claus EG Lundgren. (1997). ". In: EJ Maney Jr and CH Ellis Jr (Eds.) Diving for Science...1997. Proceedings of the American Academy of Underwater Sciences (17th Annual Scientific Diving Symposium).

Quotes

Awards
UHMS Craig Hoffman Memorial / Charles W. Shilling Award (For outstanding contribution to teaching, education and / or diving safety), June 2015
SSI Platinum Pro Diver Award, November 2014
EUROTEK.2014 Publication Award, 
AAUS Service Recognition Award (2007 - 2012 BOD Service), American Academy of Underwater Sciences, September 2012
Johnson Space Center Group Achievement Award, National Aeronautics and Space Administration, September 2011
Peer Reviewer Recognition Award, Wilderness and Environmental Medicine, June 2010

References

 

Canadian underwater divers
Living people
Year of birth missing (living people)
Academic staff of Université Laval